İkitelli Sanayi is an underground rapid transit interchange station on the M3 and M9 lines of the Istanbul Metro. It is located in southern Başakşehir under Bedrettin Dalan Boulevard. It has an island platform serviced by two tracks. It opened on 14 June 2013 and became an interchange station with the M9 on 29 May 2021.

Layout

References

Railway stations opened in 2013
Istanbul metro stations
Başakşehir